Incheh Rahbari (also Romanized as Īncheh Rahbarī; also known as Īncheh') is a village in Ijrud-e Bala Rural District, in the Central District of Ijrud County, Zanjan Province, Iran. At the 2006 census, its population was 718, in 166 families.

References 

Populated places in Ijrud County